Tumult Records (stylized tUMULt) is an independent record label in San Francisco run by Andee Connors (also of Aquarius Records). It has released music by Acid Mothers Temple, Avarus, Brainbombs, Circle, Eikenskaden, Guapo, Harvey Milk, Leviathan, The Margins, The Ohsees, Skullflower, and Souled American.

In 2007, plans were made for a sublabel of tUMULt named Heavy Rescue, aiming to rerelease "lost eighties metal classics." That project seems to still be unrealized.

See also 
 List of record labels

References

External links
 Official site
 tUMULt Records Discography

Noise music record labels
Experimental music record labels
American independent record labels